Neumgna is a rural locality in the South Burnett Region, Queensland, Australia. In the  Neumgna had a population of 9 people.  The north east part of Neumgna is dominated by the Meandu Mine.

History 
Neumgna State School opened on 12 July 1920 and closed circa 1955.

In the  Neumgna had a population of 9 people.

References 

South Burnett Region
Localities in Queensland